The Okobie road tanker explosion occurred on 12 July 2012 when a tank truck in Okobie, Nigeria, fell into a ditch, spilled its petrol contents, and subsequently exploded, killing at least 121.

The tanker attempted to avoid a collision with two cars and a bus, veered into a ditch, and spilled fuel. Hundreds of locals rushed to the scene to take some of the spilled petrol.

About 40 minutes after the accident, the tanker exploded.  The death toll was initially placed at 95, including 93 people who perished instantly and two who died after being brought to hospital. The death toll was later revised to 121 after more bodies were recovered from neighboring villages where they had been taken by their relatives. The number of injured was at least 75, although the actual number was likely higher as some were treated by relatives or at private clinics. Some 34 motorcycle taxis were destroyed. The drivers of the motorcycles, known as Okada in Nigeria, came to scoop up spilled fuel for their vehicles after learning of the accident and became victims of the explosion.

In separate statements, the Nigerian National Emergency Management Agency (NEMA) and the Federal Road Safety Commission of Rivers State gave the same figures for the incident. The NEMA statement also said that "rescue workers from the police, road safety, fire service, civil defence and NEMA were at the scene to evacuate victims and control traffic". Nigerian President Goodluck Jonathan said he was "deeply saddened by the loss of many lives" and "particularly distraught by the fact that, once again, so many Nigerian lives have been lost in an avoidable fuel fire disaster". Jonathan was referring to two previous incidents: one in March 2012 killing six people and one in April 2011 killing 50.

See also
 Ibadan road tanker explosion
 2010 South Kivu tank truck explosion
 2017 Bahawalpur explosion
 Morogoro tanker explosion

References

2012 in Nigeria
2010s in Rivers State
July 2012 events in Nigeria
2012 road incidents
Explosions in 2012
Explosions in Nigeria
Road incidents in Nigeria
Events in Rivers State
Deaths caused by petroleum looting
Industrial fires and explosions
Tanker explosions
2012 disasters in Nigeria